Thorleif Hartung (1 July 1907 – 6 June 1982) was a Norwegian footballer. He played in one match for the Norway national football team in 1933.

References

External links
 

1907 births
1982 deaths
Norwegian footballers
Norway international footballers
Place of birth missing
Association footballers not categorized by position